Lionel Jayatilleke (July 24, 1924 - September 1988) was a Sri Lankan politician. He was elected for Kuliyapitiya in the 8th parliamentary election in 1977. He was assassinated, allegedly by the extremist Sinhalese group the Janatha Vimukthi Peramuna (People's Liberation Front) for his party's support of the Indo-Sri Lanka Accord.

References

1924 births
1988 deaths
Assassinated Sri Lankan politicians
Members of the 8th Parliament of Sri Lanka
Sinhalese politicians
United National Party politicians